Campbell Glacier Tongue is the seaward extension of Campbell Glacier into northern Terra Nova Bay, on the coast of Victoria Land. The name was suggested by the Advisory Committee on Antarctic Names in association with Campbell Glacier.

References
 

Ice tongues of Antarctica
Glaciers of Scott Coast